The 1977–78 UEFA Cup was won by PSV Eindhoven on aggregate over Bastia.

The third club was revoked to Hungary and Romania, and it was assigned to Switzerland and Poland.

First round

|}

First leg

UEFA invalidated this game and awarded a 3–0 victory to Schalke 04 as Fiorentina fielded an ineligible player, Gianfranco Casarsa.

Second leg

Eintracht Frankfurt won 5–0 on aggregate.

AZ Alkmaar won 16–1 on aggregate.

Aston Villa won 6–0 on aggregate.

Barcelona won 8–2 on aggregate.

Bastia won 5–3 on aggregate.

Bayern Munich won 12–0 on aggregate.

Lazio won 5–1 on aggregate.

Newcastle United won 4–0 on aggregate.

Carl Zeiss Jena won 6–5 on aggregate.

KB won 3–1 on aggregate.

Schalke 04 won 5–1 on aggregate.

Grasshoppers won 8–1 on aggregate.

PSV Eindhoven won 11–2 on aggregate.

Górnik Zabrze won 5–3 on aggregate.

Dinamo Tbilisi won 1–0 on aggregate.

1–1 on aggregate, Eintracht Braunschweig won on away goals.

Ipswich Town won 6–0 on aggregate.

Las Palmas won 8–4 on aggregate.

Lens won 4–3 on aggregate.

Újpest won 9–3 on aggregate.

Magdeburg won 3–2 on aggregate.

Dinamo Zagreb won 6–4 on aggregate.

2–2 on aggregate, Widzew Łódź won on away goals rule.

Marek Dupnitsa won 3–2 on aggregate.

Inter Bratislava won 3–1 on aggregate.

R.W.D. Molenbeek won 2–1 on aggregate.

Athletic Bilbao won 2–1 on aggregate.

3–3 on aggregate, Standard Liège won on away goals rule.

Start won 8–0 on aggregate.

AEK Athens won 3–1 on aggregate.

Torino won 4–1 on aggregate.

Zürich won 2–1 on aggregate.

Second round

|}

First leg

Second leg

Standard Liège won 6–3 on aggregate.

2–2 on aggregate, Barcelona won in a penalty shoot-out.

Aston Villa won 3–1 on aggregate.

Bastia won 5–2 on aggregate.

Bayern Munich won 3–2 on aggregate.

Grasshoppers won 5–2 on aggregate.

Ipswich Town won 4–3 on aggregate.

Dinamo Tbilisi won 6–2 on aggregate.

Lens won 6–2 on aggregate.

Magdeburg won 7–3 on aggregate.

2–2 on aggregate, Carl Zeiss Jena won in a penalty shoot-out.

Eintracht Braunschweig won 4–1 on aggregate.

Torino won 3–2 on aggregate.

Athletic Bilbao won 3–2 on aggregate.

PSV Eindhoven won 6–3 on aggregate.

Eintracht Frankfurt won 7–3 on aggregate.

Third round

|}

First leg

Second leg

Aston Villa won 3–1 on aggregate.

Bastia won 5–3 on aggregate.

Carl Zeiss Jena won 4–1 on aggregate.

Eintracht Frankfurt won 6–1 on aggregate.

3–3 on aggregate, Barcelona won in a penalty shoot-out.

Magdeburg won 4–2 on aggregate.

PSV Eindhoven won 4–1 on aggregate.

Grasshoppers won 4–1 on aggregate.

Quarter-finals

|}

First leg

Second leg

Barcelona won 4–3 on aggregate.

Bastia won 9–6 on aggregate.

PSV Eindhoven won 4–3 on aggregate.

3–3 on aggregate, Grasshoppers won on away goals rule.

Semi-finals

|}

First leg

Second leg

3–3 on aggregate, Bastia won on away goals rule.

PSV won 4–3 on aggregate.

Final

First leg

Second leg

PSV Eindhoven won 3–0 on aggregate

External links
1977–78 All matches UEFA Cup – season at UEFA website
Official Site
Results at RSSSF.com
 All scorers 1977–78 UEFA Cup according to protocols UEFA
1977/78 UEFA Cup - results and line-ups (archive)

UEFA Cup seasons
2